Phyllocnistis extrematrix is a moth of the family Gracillariidae. It is known from Kazakhstan, Romania, and the European part of Russia.

The larvae feed on Populus balsamifera, Populus nigra and Populus suaveolens.

References

Phyllocnistis
Moths of Europe